Sinar Mas is one of the largest conglomerates in Indonesia. It was formed in 1938. It has numerous subsidiaries including Asia Pulp & Paper and palm oil producer PT SMART. The company also acquired Berau Coal Energy from Asia Resource Minerals PLC, a major mining group founded by Nathaniel Philip Rothschild, in a takeover initiated by Fuganto Widjaja.

Sinar Mas was founded by a Chinese Indonesian tycoon, Eka Tjipta Widjaja.

Sinar Mas businesses operate in different sectors such as pulp & paper, real estate, financial services, agribusiness, telecommunications, and mining. The businesses are listed in the Indonesian and Singapore stock exchanges.

Business units

 PT Innovate Mas Indonesia
 PT Mora Quatro Multimedia (CEPAT NET, HOMELinks)
 PT Sinar Mas Komunikasi Teknologi Tbk (Sinar Mas Communication & Technology)
 PT Smartfren Telecom Tbk (Smartfren)
 PT Ahamobi Telecom Tbk (AhaMobi)
 PT The Univenus
 PT Sinar Dunia Makmur (Sinar Dunia)
 PT Indah Kiat Pulp & Paper Tbk (Asia Pulp & Paper)
 Indah Kiat Pulp & Paper Industries Tbk
 PT Pabrik Kertas Tjiwi Kimia Tbk
 PT Pindo Deli Pulp and Paper Mills
 PT Lontar Papyrus Pulp & Paper Industry
 PT Ekamas Fortuna
 PT Purinusa Ekapersada
 PT Sinar Mas Agro Resources and Technology Tbk
 PT Sinar Mas Multiartha Tbk (Sinar Mas Multiartha)
 PT Bank Sinarmas Tbk (Sinarmas Bank)
 PT Simas Money Changer
 PT Asuransi Jiwa Sinarmas MSIG
 PT Arthamas Konsulindo
 PT Sinarartha Konsulindo
 PT Asuransi Sinar Mas (Sinar Mas Insurance)
 PT KB Insurance Indonesia
 PT Asuransi Summit Otto
 PT Sinar Mas Multifinance
 PT AB Sinar Mas Multifinance
 PT Sinartama Gunita
 PT Sinarmas Sekuritas
 PT Sinarmas Aset Management
 PT Sinarmas Futures
 PT Komunindo Arga Digital
 PT Arthamas Informatika
 PT Arthamas Solusindo
 PT Sinar Artha Inforindo
 PT Sinar Artha Solusindo
 PT Super Wahana Tehno
 PT Panji Ratu Jakarta
 PT Wapindo Jasaartha
 PT Balai Lelang Sinarmas
 PT Artha Bina Usaha
 PT Sinar Artha Trading
 PT Autopro Utama Perkasa
 Sinar Mas Land
 BSD City
 BSD Techno Park
 Kota Deltamas
 Greenland International Industrial City
 Karawang International Industrial City
 Orchard Towers
 Damai Indah Golf
 Le Grandeur Jakarta
 Le Grandeur Balikpapan
 Eka Hospital
 PT Dian Swastatika Sentosa Tbk
 PT Golden Energy Mines Tbk (Sinar Mas Mining)
 Eka Tjipta Foundation

Criticism and controversies

Defaults
In 2001, Asia Pulp & Paper (APP), the subsidiary of Sinar Mas, called a standstill on $14 billion worth of bonds and loans and stopped repaying its debt, including interest payments, in what is still the largest default to foreign investors in Asian market history. On August 15, 2018, the Anti Forest Mafia Coalition, published a report revealing that two APP suppliers in East Kalimantan had cleared nearly 32,000 hectares of natural forest, in violation of APP’s no-deforestation commitment in February 2013. Prior to this, APP and its pulpwood suppliers had a history of almost 30 years of deforestation and related destruction in the region. APP has hence remained one of only three companies in the world that the Forest Stewardship Council has disassociated from since October 2007. On September 7, 2018, the World Wide Fund for Nature (WWF) openly recommended that companies and financial investors end their business relationships with APP and its affiliates.

In 2015, Sinar Mas through APP Sinar Mas introduced the "Desa Makmur Peduli Api" (DMPA) program as a development of various public empowerment programs it had previously done. Originally, the DMPA was initiated to mitigate fires and encroachment of forests and lands around the company's concession area. But in its development, the DMPA's role became more holistic and not only mitigated, but also developed self-sufficiency for the villagers through eco-friendly forestry and eradicated tenure disputes in the region.

Berau Coal
Berau Capital Resources Pte issued US$450 million worth of 12.5% guaranteed senior secured notes, in 2015. PT Berau Coal Energy also issued US$500 million worth of 7.25% guaranteed senior notes in 2017. Both the 2015 and 2017 notes are currently in default. Since July 2015, the Berau Group has brought 4 separate rounds of scheme of arrangement / moratorium proceedings, with terms which have been described as “frankly insulting” at a time when global coal prices had doubled. None of the schemes has succeeded.

Environmental concerns
Smart Tbk, the palm-oil producing subsidiary of Sinarmas Group, has been accused by Greenpeace of causing deforestation of Indonesian rainforests. To investigate this accusation, Smart Tbk has appointed Control Union Certification and BSI Group, assisted by two researchers from the Bogor Agricultural Institute.

Haze in Singapore and Malaysia

Sinar Mas is one of the eight companies responsible for sending hazardous level of smog to Singapore and Malaysia. Yet, company said forest fires within concession areas did not mean that it was the company that had started the fire. Sinar Mas had not been involved in any deforestation since 2013 and have zero burning policy since 1997.

Unilever

In December 2009, Unilever suspended purchases of palm oil from Smart Tbk, citing concerns that Smart Tbk had not provided sufficient evidence that they are not involved in unacceptable environmental practices. However, Unilever plan to resume Palm Oil purchases if independent auditors, formed by Sinar Mas and Unilever, disprove allegations of forest destruction.

Nestle

In March 2010, Nestle faced a public reputation crisis over its procurement of palm oil from Sinar Mas whose plantations are reported to be the cause of widespread rainforest and orangutan habitat destruction. To avert the public reputation disaster, Nestle quickly moved to stop its palm oil procurement from Sinar Mas. After Sinar Mas appointed independent auditors to investigate the issue, Nestle joined the committee and may resume palm oil procurement from Sinar Mas if they are cleared of the allegations. In August 2010 the Nestle chairman Peter Brabeck-Letmathe stated that the focus on his company is misguided. "You know very well that it's not Nestle's 350,000 tons of palm oil that brought about deforestation in Indonesia," he said, "but a political decision to use food as a source for biofuels."
The United Kingdom and Germany alone have consumed 500,000 tons of palm oil for biofuels between them, he said.

Abengoa
In May 2010, Abengoa Bioenergy asked its raw material suppliers to boycott palm oil from any company in the Indonesian group of Sinar Mas, until it can demonstrate that it fully complies with Abengoa’s environmental and social sustainability policy.

HSBC
In May 2010, focus of the Greenpeace campaign moved to HSBC, calling for them to sell their stocks in Sinar Mas. HSBC had admitted it held shares in Golden Agri-Resources Ltd, the palm oil arm of the Sinar Mas Group, via asset management funds including its Climate Change Fund. Although according to the bank's ethical forestry policy, the bank would not finance plantations converted from natural forest since June 2004, the rule then did not apply to its asset management funds.

By July 2010, HSBC had written to Greenpeace to inform them that the shares had been sold.

Carrefour
In July 2010, Carrefour has dropped Sinar Mas as its supplier. “Carrefour is committed to sustainable development and has decided to cease sourcing of APP supplies for private label products from mid-year this year until further notice.” Carrefour Indonesia external communication manager Hendri Satrio told The Jakarta Post in a letter.

Burger King
In September 2010, Burger King announced that they would no longer source Palm Oil from Sinar Mas. They published a statement announcing:
"After completing a thorough review of the independent verification report conducted by Control Union Certification (CUC) and BSI Group, we believe the report has raised valid concerns about some of the sustainability practices of Sinar Mas' palm oil production and its impact on the rainforest. These practices are inconsistent with our corporate responsibility commitments"

Mattel
On 7 June 2011, Greenpeace launched "Barbie, It's Over", a global campaign to bring awareness and encourage Mattel to switch pulp and paper producers. 
Mattel uses paper sourced from Asia Pulp & Paper, one of the subsidiaries of Sinar Mas Group in its product packaging, particularly in packaging in the Barbie line of toys.

Exhibition & Convention Center
Together with Kompas Gramedia Group, Sinar Mas Land has built ICE on 22 hectares of land in Bumi Serpong Damai, which is the largest convention and exhibition centre in Indonesia. The ICE, started in 2012 and completed in 2016, equipped with 10 exhibition halls, a convention center, and a 300-room hotel on site. The center will be able to accommodate at least 200,000 visitors a day and 10,000 people concert hall .

Philanthropy
Recently the company has created Eka Tjipta Foundation, a philanthropic foundation that focuses on Education, Poverty and Renewable Energy. Jaya Suprana from the Indonesian Museum of Records (MURI) presented a certificate to the Eka Tjipta Foundation, a non-profit organization under one of the country’s largest conglomerates, Sinar Mas, for granting “the largest number of scholarships for undergraduate students during certain period".

Sponsorships
The Sinar Mas Group has been the jersey sponsor of the Indonesian national basketball team since 2021.

References

External links

 
 

 
Pulp and paper companies of Indonesia
Conglomerate companies of Indonesia
Palm oil companies of Indonesia
Companies based in Jakarta
Conglomerate companies established in 1962
Indonesian companies established in 1962
Agriculture companies established in 1962